Martijn Kuiper (born November 26, 1970) is a Dutch actor. He has played roles in the Spanish television. In 2016 he won the award for best actor in the International Festival of Short Films of Terror and Fantastic "Terroríficamente Cortos". He won the "Ojitos" prize for best actor of the 2020 Morelia International Film Festival for his role in Ricochet, a film by Rodrigo Fiallega.

Filmography

Film

Television roles

References

External links 
 

1970 births
Living people
Male actors from Amsterdam
Dutch expatriates in Spain
Dutch expatriates in Mexico
Dutch male film actors
Dutch male television actors